Mathew Mellor (born 1839, died 17 February 1899) was a politician in Queensland, Australia. He was mayor of Gympie and a Member of the Queensland Legislative Assembly.

Politics 
Mellor was the first mayor of the Borough of Gympie (later City of Gympie). He served first from 1880 to 1881 and then again in 1897.

Mellor also served two terms as a Member of the Queensland Legislative Assembly, holding the seat of Wide Bay from 1883 to 1888 and Gympie from 1888 to 1893.

Personal life
Mellor married Martha Pache and they had two sons. He then married Mary Ann Bouchard in 1880. Together three sons and four daughters.

Dying in 1899, Mellor was buried in the Gympie Cemetery.

References

External links

  — Obituary

Mayors of places in Queensland
19th-century Australian politicians
People from Gympie
1839 births
1899 deaths